Predrag Đorđević (born 30 June 1990) is a Serbian professional footballer who plays as a defender for Dubočica.

Club career
After playing with Dubočica in the Serbian League East, Đorđević moved to SuperLiga club Jagodina in the summer of 2010. He was loaned to First League club Sinđelić Niš in the 2011–12 season, making 28 appearances and scoring eight goals. In August 2012, Đorđević was transferred to Javor Ivanjica. He immediately became a first team regular, establishing himself as one of the best right-backs in the league. Đorđević made 46 league appearances and scored two goals in his two seasons at the club.

External links
 
 
 
 Predrag Đorđević at Utakmica.rs 
  

1990 births
Living people
Association football defenders
FK Dubočica players
FK Jagodina players
FK Javor Ivanjica players
FK Sinđelić Niš players
FK Mladost Lučani players
FK Radnik Surdulica players
OFK Beograd players
FK Novi Pazar players
Sportspeople from Leskovac
Red Star Belgrade footballers
Serbian footballers
Serbian First League players
Serbian SuperLiga players